La ruleta de la suerte is an Uruguayan television game show based on the original American series Wheel of Fortune. Presented by Rafael Villanueva and Roxanne Machin, it is broadcast on Teledoce. The show debuted on August 11, 2020, being, its first episode, the fourth most viewed of the day, reaching 10.9 rating points. It airs on Tuesdays and Thursdays at 9 p.m.

In each episode, three participants face different blank word puzzles; they must choose consonants and buy vowels, to solve common sayings and phrases. In this way, they manage to accumulate prizes, to be able to win a 0KM car.

Production 
Initially, the show was going to be presented by Fernando Vilar, who had been summoned to host an entertainment program for the first time. However, after having participated in the rehearsals with the scenography prepared, he decided to abandon the project, arguing that he "did not measure up" to such a challenge. Finally, Rafael Villanueva was chosen to host the program.

As part of the advertising campaign for the show, on the morning of the debut day, the Desayunos informales team was invited to test the game on the set.

Ratings

References

External links 

 Official Website

Uruguayan television shows
Wheel of Fortune (franchise)
Roulette and wheel games
2020 Uruguayan television series debuts
2020s Uruguayan television series
2020s Uruguayan television series debuts
Teledoce original programming